North Pownal is an unincorporated community and census-designated place (CDP) in the town of Pownal, Bennington County, Vermont, United States. It was first listed as a CDP prior to the 2020 census.

The Hoosic River, a west-flowing tributary of the Hudson River, flows through the center of the community. Vermont Route 346 is the main road through the village, leading southeast  to U.S. Route 7 at Pownal village. To the northwest, VT 346/NY 346 leads  to North Petersburg, New York.

References 

Populated places in Bennington County, Vermont
Census-designated places in Bennington County, Vermont
Census-designated places in Vermont